Berliner Abendpost (meaning Berlin Evening Mail in English) was a German-language daily newspaper published in Berlin. The paper was part of the Ullstein company, led by Leopold Ullstein. The newspaper and its owner were liberal in its political orientation.

See also
 Manfred George

References

Daily newspapers published in Germany
Defunct newspapers published in Germany
German-language newspapers
Newspapers published in Berlin
Publications with year of disestablishment missing
Publications with year of establishment missing